Darul Uloom Mau is an Islamic Madrasa which was established in Mau in 1875.

Notable alumni
 Abdul Haq Azmi
 Habib Al-Rahman Al-Azmi
 Habibur Rahman Khairabadi
 Manzur Nu'mani
 Muhammad Mustafa Azmi
 Mujahidul Islam Qasmi
 Noor Alam Khalil Amini

See also
Al-Jamiatul Asaria Darul Hadees

References

Islamic education in India
Madrasas in India
Mau
Mau district